The Vaio Y series is a line of notebook computer from Sony introduced in January 2010. It is a netbook-inspired model designed for travel use: compared with the other 13.3" models in the Vaio range, the Y lacks an optical drive, and is heavier and cheaper than the premium Sony Vaio Z series, but lighter than the consumer-grade Sony Vaio S series, with better battery life than either, thanks to the use of CULV processors. The weight is 3.92lbs (1.78kg).

The Y series features a 13.3" 16:9 1366x768 screen, 2-8GB of DDR3 RAM, hard drive or SSD, CULV Intel dual-core CPU, Mobile Intel Intel GMA 4500MHD or ATI Mobility Radeon HD 4550 graphics (refreshed models only), integrated VGA webcam, gigabit ethernet, 802.11b/g/n wireless,  and Windows 7 64 bit. Initially the Y series shipped with a Core 2 CULV CPUs; the mid-2010 refresh saw these replaced with newer Arrandale CULV chips.

Battery specs are 5000 mAh (330g - standard) or 7500 mAh (490g - extended).

Models (USA & Europe)

Launch
 VPC-Y115FX: Intel Core 2 SU7300 (1.30 GHz), 4GB RAM, 320GB 5200rpm hard drive, Intel GS45 graphics, Windows 7 Home Premium ($799)
 VPC-Y118GX: Intel Core 2 SU7300 (1.30 GHz), 4GB RAM, 500GB 5200rpm hard drive, Intel GS45 graphics, Windows 7 Home Premium, included additional high-capacity battery ($999)
 VPC-Y11S1E (Sold in Europe): Intel Core 2 SU7300 (1.30 GHz), 4GB RAM, 320GB 5400rpm hard drive, Intel Media Accelerator 4500 MHD graphics, Windows 7 Home Premium 64-bit

Refresh
 VPC-Y21EFX and VPC-Y21SFX: Intel Core i3-330UM 1.20GHz, 4GB RAM, 320GB 5200rpm hard drive, Intel GS45 graphics, Windows 7 Home Premium
 VPC-2190X: Intel Pentium U5400 (1.20GHz), Core i3-330UM (1.20GHz) or Core i5-430UM (1.20GHz with Turbo Boost to 1.73GHz), 320 or 500GB hard drive or 256GB SSD, 2GB, 4GB, 6GB or 8GB of RAM, Intel GMA 4500 or ATI Mobility Radeon HD 4550 graphics, Windows 7 Home Premium or Professional

External links

Sony Vaio VPCY11S1E VAIO Series Y 

Y